Berthold Ebbecke (1906–1969) was a German actor and screenwriter. He collaborated with Ludwig Metzger.

Selected filmography

Actor
 Trouble Backstairs (1935)
 The Court Concert (1936)
 The Beggar Student (1936)
 Ride to Freedom (1937)
 Secret Code LB 17 (1938)
 Nanon (1939)
 In the Name of the People (1939)
 The Murder Trial of Doctor Jordan (1949)
 The Trip to Marrakesh (1949)
 Theodore the Goalkeeper (1950)

Writer
 Secret Code LB 17 (1938)
 Central Rio (1939)

References

Bibliography 
 Noack, Frank. Veit Harlan: The Life and Work of a Nazi Filmmaker. University Press of Kentucky, 2016.
 Tegel, Susan. Jew Suss: Life, Legend, Fiction, Film. A&C Black, 2011.

External links 
 

1906 births
1969 deaths
Mass media people from Karlsruhe
German male screenwriters
German male film actors
Film people from Baden-Württemberg
20th-century German screenwriters